Badhaai Ho is a 2018 Indian Hindi-language comedy drama film directed by Amit Ravindernath Sharma and produced by Sharma, Aleya Sen and Hemant Bhandari under Chrome Pictures and Vineet Jain under Junglee Pictures. It stars Ayushmann Khurrana and Neena Gupta with Gajraj Rao, Surekha Sikri, Shardul Rana and Sanya Malhotra in supporting roles. The film tells the story of a middle-aged couple who get pregnant, much to the disappointment of their sons. Based on a script written by Shantanu Srivastava and Akshat Ghildial and a story conceived by Jyoti Kapoor.

Badhaai Ho received positive reviews and was a commercial success. The film won four awards at the 64th Filmfare Awards, including Best Actress (Critics) for Gupta, Best Supporting Actress for Sikri, and Best Supporting Actor for Rao. It also won two National Film Awards: Best Popular Film Providing Wholesome Entertainment, the first time where two films featuring the same lead actor (Khurrana) has won both Best Film awards at the National Awards as Andhadhun won Best Film, and Best Supporting Actress for Sikri.

A spiritual successor titled Badhaai Do, released on 11 February 2022.

Plot
Nakul Kaushik is a 26-year-old boy and is in a stable relationship with his colleague, Renee. Her mother Sangeeta likes him and approves of their relationship. His father Jeetender 'Jeetu' Kaushik, is a middle-aged man working in the Railways. His mother Priyamvada is a typical housewife. His younger brother Gullar is a high school student. His grandmother Durga always quarrels with Priyamvada and dominates over her son Jeetu. One day, she taunts Priyamvada, who gets upset. Jeetu consoles his wife and they get intimate.

19 weeks later, Priyamvada realizes she is pregnant. She finds it sinful to abort the child. Jeetu announces Priyamvada's third pregnancy to the family. The two sons are embarrassed and start to avoid their parents, friends, and society. Durga shocked and upset as well.

The news becomes viral and they are made fun of by family, friends, relatives, and society. Nakul begins to avoid Renee. Jeetu and Priyamvada ask Nakul and Gullar to accompany them to Meerut for their cousin's wedding. Both of them refuse by making excuses, not wanting to interact with anyone. This makes Jeetu angry at them and he leaves with Priyamvada and Durga. Meanwhile, Renee offers a room date to cheer Nakul up. But he is unable to get intimate with her as it reminds him of Priyamvada's pregnancy. Sangeeta gets to know about Priyamvada's pregnancy from Renee. She is shocked and speaks ill about the Kaushik family. Nakul overhears this, delivers a harsh monologue to Sangeeta, and breaks up with Renee.

While in Meerut and Muzaffarnagar, Jeetu's elder sister-in-law and sister ridicules Priyamvada for her late pregnancy. For the first time, Durga defends Priyamvada for her dutifulness and makes them realize their selfishness and mean attitude towards her.

Gullar reveals to Nakul that some boys made fun of him at school and when he responded to them, one of them hit him. Nakul goes to the school the next day and Gullar slaps the boy thrice. Nakul meets own friends and when one of them taunts him, he gives a befitting reply. He reconciles with his parents and begins to fulfill his duties as a son. Priyamvada realizes that Nakul has broken up with Renee, and she tells him to apologize to Renee's mother. Nakul reluctantly agrees.

As the baby shower preparations begin, Priyamvada goes into labor pain and is immediately taken to the hospital. Sangeeta tells Renee about Nakul's apology and also that she has forgiven Nakul. Renee rushes to Nakul's home and then to the hospital. After the delivery, the doctor announces the birth of a baby girl.

15 months later, Nakul and Renee get engaged in the presence of their families including his baby sister.

Cast
 Ayushmann Khurrana as Nakul Kaushik
 Neena Gupta as Priyamvada "Babli" Kaushik
 Gajraj Rao as Jitendra "Jeetu" Kaushik
 Surekha Sikri as Durgamati Kaushik
 Sanya Malhotra as Renee Sharma
 Sheeba Chaddha as Sangeeta Sharma
 Shardul Rana as Vishwas Kaushik
 Alka Kaushal as Guddan Kaushik
 Alka Amin as Kokila Kaushik
 Manoj Bakshi as Virendra Kaushik
 Arun Kalra as Sunil Ji

Production
The film was shot in two schedules. Principal photography began on 29 January 2018 and the first schedule, in Mumbai, wrapped on 11 February. The second schedule began on 16 February 2018 in Delhi around Street No1, Darya Ganj Ansari Road and ended on 21 March 2018.

Reception

Box office

Badhaai Ho had a positive first day, earning ₹7.35 crore at the box office, as reported by Boxofficeindia.com. The movie collected ₹56.85 crore in 6 days and went on to collect ₹135.95 crore at the Indian Box Office by the 7th week of its release. Its eventual worldwide gross was ₹221.48 crore.

Remakes
The film is set to be remade in Tamil, Telugu, Kannada and Malayalam by Boney Kapoor. The Tamil remake is titled Veetla Vishesham.

The film is set to be remake in Indonesian by Falcon Pictures entitled Keluarga Slamet with cast Dessy Ratnasari, Indro Warkop and Widyawati.

Soundtrack  

The songs are composed by Tanishk Bagchi, Rochak Kohli, JAM8 and Sunny Bawra-Inder Bawra. The lyrics are written by Vayu, Kumaar and MellowD. The song ''Morni Banke'' was originally composed by Punjabi MC.

Awards and nominations

Sequel
Junglee Pictures announced in March 2020 that Rajkummar Rao and Bhumi Pednekar will star in the official spiritual sequel of Badhaai Ho, titled Badhaai Do.  Initially set to go on floors in June 2020, it was delayed due to the COVID-19 pandemic in India. Principal photography finally commenced on 5 January 2021 in Dehradun, as announced by Rao & Pednekar on their social media accounts.

References

External links
 
 
 

Indian comedy-drama films
Indian pregnancy films
2010s Hindi-language films
Best Popular Film Providing Wholesome Entertainment National Film Award winners
Films featuring a Best Supporting Actress National Film Award-winning performance
2018 comedy-drama films
Films directed by Amit Sharma (director)
Hindi films remade in other languages